Borasu Pass or Bara-su (el. ) is a high mountain pass in the Himalaya Mountains of Uttarakhand in the India. The pass is located on the border of Uttarakhand and Himachal Pradesh near the border with Tibet. It was an ancient trade route between Har Ki Doon valley and Kinnaur valley.

Geography 
Borasu Pass divides Uttarakhand from Himachal Pradesh. The pass is located only a few kilometers from the Tibet border. The east part of the Borasu area comes out from Tons valley and the north-west part is merged with Baspa valley. Its north-west range comes down on Jhukia Glacier. The nearest village, Chitkul, is away from the pass. on the Himachal Pradesh (Kinnaur valley) side and Osla village on the Uttarakhand side of the pass.

Approach to the pass is marked by grasslands. Mountains Bandarpunch, Black Peak or Kalanag, Swargarohini and Har Ki Doon may be observed from the pass.

Climate 
Precipitation in Baspa Valley is low in scale. Comparatively in the side of Tons valley rainfall is often common. Generally, snowfall is received after October.

See also
Rupin Pass
Saach Pass
Pin Parvati Pass
Takling La

References 

Mountain passes of Himachal Pradesh
Mountain passes of the Himalayas
Geography of Kinnaur district